Yuliya Tarasova (born 13 March 1986) is an Uzbekistani heptathlete and long jumper.

Tarasova was born in Tashkent. She finished seventh at the 2003 World Youth Championships, fourteenth at the 2004 World Junior Championships, 26th at the 2008 Olympic Games, and 21st at the 2009 World Championships. She won the gold medal at the 2009 Asian Championships and the 2010 Asian Games.

Her personal best score is 5989 points, achieved in May 2009 in Desenzano del Garda.

Competition record

References

1986 births
Living people
Uzbekistani female long jumpers
Uzbekistani heptathletes
Sportspeople from Tashkent
Athletes (track and field) at the 2008 Summer Olympics
Athletes (track and field) at the 2012 Summer Olympics
Athletes (track and field) at the 2016 Summer Olympics
Olympic athletes of Uzbekistan
Asian Games medalists in athletics (track and field)
Athletes (track and field) at the 2010 Asian Games
Athletes (track and field) at the 2014 Asian Games
Asian Games gold medalists for Uzbekistan
Asian Games bronze medalists for Uzbekistan
Medalists at the 2010 Asian Games
Medalists at the 2014 Asian Games
IAAF Continental Cup winners
Competitors at the 2013 Summer Universiade
21st-century Uzbekistani women